The Highland Aborigine constituency is a multi-member constituency of the Legislative Yuan. Taiwanese indigenous people have elected representatives to reserved legislative seats since the 1970s. Predecessors to both the Highland and Lowland Aborigine districts were established in 1994. Since 2008, the Highland Taiwanese indigenous elect three members to the Legislative Yuan.

Legislators

Election results

References 

Constituencies in Taiwan
Taiwanese indigenous peoples